Alexandros Paschalakis (born 28 July 1989) is a Greek professional footballer who plays as a goalkeeper for Super League club Olympiacos and the Greece national team.

Club career

Early career
Paschalakis started playing football in Terpsithea. He was at the youth team of AEK for a year and then at the youth team of Olympiakos for 2 years (2003–2005). He moved to the team of Ilioupoli. At the age of 17 he transferred to the youth team of Galatasaray but he couldn't sign a contract due to restrictions on the number of foreign players.

He signed for Levadiakos in the summer of 2008. He signed for PAEEK in the summer of 2012. Akhisar was interested in Paschalakis but he didn't want to move there. After returning to Greece and spending six months in limbo, he signed for Panthrakikos in January 2014, but played just 13 matches until January 2016.

PAS Giannina
He signed for PAS Giannina on 26 January 2016, to replace Markos Vellidis' transfer to PAOK. He didn't play at all in his first six months in Ioannina. On 25 July 2017, the 28-year-old goalkeeper that was bound by a contract to the club until the summer of 2018, had made an appeal due to a delay in his annual salary. The Athenian goalie had an outstanding season playing in 27 games, out of which four in UEFA Europa League. PAOK, along with Asteras Tripoli and Panathinaikos expressed interest in his acquisition, having 9 clean sheets. On 1 August, Paschalakis was released from PAS Giannina.

PAOK

On 7 August 2017, he signed a year contract with PAOK for an undisclosed fee. On 2 December 2017, he made his debut in a 3–0 away win against Xanthi A day later he renewed his contract with the club till the summer of 2020. The 28-year-old goalkeeper has increased his earnings and the release clause will be set in the region of €5 million.

It was initially planned that he would be back-up to Argentinian Rodrigo Rey, but since head coach Răzvan Lucescu gave him a chance, Paschalakis has made himself PAOK's starter. As of 4 February 2018, Paschalakis holds PAOK's record for most consecutive minutes without conceding, with 971 excluding stoppage time (1008 in total), before conceding in a 1–3 away win over PAS Giannina, to surpass current runner-up Kostas Chalkias with 859 min. Unsurprisingly, PAOK boast the Superleague's tightest defence with seven goals conceded in nineteen matches, a statistic which is largely down to Paschalakis' superb performances between the sticks.

On 8 August 2018, Paschalakis saves second-half Quincy Promes's penalty in a 3–2 home win game for UEFA Champions League Third qualifying round, 1st leg against Spartak Moscow, helping his team to maintain the win.
At the first half of the 2018–19 season Paschalakis played every minute of domestic championship action, conceding a mere six goals in 15 matches while tallying an impressive nine clean sheets. On 17 January 2019, Paschalakis was awarded a new contract with PAOK through to 2022, and assuming he continues keeping the opponents off the scoreboard, PAOK will surely win the Greek championship for the first time in 34 years.

On 25 April 2019, made a number of saves in a semifinal second leg Greek Cup game against Asteras Tripolis, helping PAOK's title defence of the Greek Cup, as the newly crowned Super League champions secured a 0–0 draw in Tripoli to progress 2–0 on aggregate.  PAOK for the third consecutive season will meet AEK Athens in the Greek Cup final.

International career
On 5 October 2018 Greece coach Michael Skibbe called up goalie Alexandros Paschalakis for upcoming 2018–19 UEFA Nations League matches against Hungary and Finland for UEFA Nations League. "All players dream of someday representing their country and I am happy for this opportunity. I waited for a long time for this call," said Paschalakis. On 30 May 2019, he made his debut in a 2–1 friendly game away loss against Turkey.

Personal life
Paschalakis has hails from Serres and Constantinople

Career statistics

Honours

Club
PAOK
Super League Greece: 2018–19
Greek Cup: 2017–18, 2018–19, 2020–21; runner-up: 2021–22

Individual
Super League Greece Goalkeeper of the Year: 2018–19
Super League Greece Team of the Year: 2018–19

References

External links

1989 births
Living people
Greece international footballers
Gamma Ethniki players
Football League (Greece) players
Super League Greece players
Levadiakos F.C. players
PAEEK players
Panthrakikos F.C. players
PAS Giannina F.C. players
PAOK FC players
Olympiacos F.C. players
Association football goalkeepers
Footballers from Athens
Greek footballers
Cypriot Second Division players
Greek expatriate sportspeople in Cyprus
Expatriate footballers in Cyprus
Greek expatriate footballers